Shahmirza Moradi (also spelled Shamirza Moradi; December 14, 1924 – December 14, 1997)  was an Iranian Luri musician especially versed in playing sorna.

Biography
Moradi was born in Dorud, Loristan.

He started learning music as a child and learned Sorna from his father.  In 1971, he began radio work; he then performed at the major cultural festivals in Iran, including those of Shiraz and Tehran. Thanks to the efforts of the Luri musician Ali Akbar Shekartchi, his first recordings were distributed in 1981.

In 1991, Moradi performed at the Avignon festival (southern France) and on the program of Persian nights July 31 and August 1, at two successive concerts in the Cloître des Célestins in Paris. His son, Reza Moradi, used to accompany him on the dohol; Reza Moradi is also a kamancheh player, an instrument that he learned from his father.

Awards 

 Avignon Festival 1991, Paris, France Edition 45

See also
Sorna
Luri music
Iranian Folk Music
Dohol
Lorestan

References

External links 

Fujie, L. (1994). The Music of Lorestiin, Iran. Performed by Shahmirza Moradi and Reza Moradi. Text by Reza Mo'ini. CD with 7-page booklet in English. Nimbus Records NI 5397. 1994. Yearbook for Traditional Music, 26, 194-194. doi:10.2307/768281 Published By: Cambridge University Press 7 March 2019
https://www.mehrnews.com/news/799258/اعجاز-سرنا-خالق-عاشقانه-های-لرستان-را-جاودان-کرد
https://www.tehrantimes.com/news/88505/Oboe-Players-to-Meet-in-Doroud
https://doroud.farhang.gov.ir/fa/news/51172/مصاحبه-با-شاه-میرزا-مرادی-مروارید-اقیانوسها
https://www.google.com/books/edition/World_Music_Africa_Europe_and_the_Middle/gyiTOcnb2yYC?hl=en&gbpv=1&bsq=moradi
World Music: Africa, Europe and the Middle East. United Kingdom: Rough Guides.
World Music: Africa, Europe and the Middle East, By Frederick Dorian, Orla Duane, James , Page 362
Avec: maître Mohammad Musavi (ney) et maître Shah-Mirza Moradi (zurnâ), Production: Festival d'Avignon, France culture et France musique

1924 births
1997 deaths
People from Dorud
Sorna players
Luri musicians